Gour Hari Dastan – The Freedom File is a 2015 Indian, biographical film on freedom fighter Gour Hari Das, directed by Anant Mahadevan. The film starred Vinay Pathak, Konkona Sen Sharma, Ranvir Shorey and Tannishtha Chatterjee, among others. The film depicts the life of the Indian freedom fighter from Odisha, Sri Gour Hari Das.

The film released on 14 August 2015, and received good response from critics.

Plot 
Gour Hari Dastaan is a story of an Odisha freedom fighter, Gour Hari Das who made his way through a long battle of silent war that lasted for 32 years, against his own government to prove his patriotic association towards the nation. He fought for a certificate recognizing his work as a freedom fighter which took three full decades to arrive. At the age of 84, the much sought-after certificate, when it was ultimately awarded, was a bittersweet victory.

Cast 
 Vinay Pathak as Gour Hari Das
 Konkona Sen Sharma as Lakshmi Das
 Ranvir Shorey as Rajiv Singhal
 Tannishtha Chatterjee as Anita
 Vikram Gokhale as Chief Minister
 Vipin Sharma as Ahirkar
 Rajit Kapoor as Mohan Joshi
 Saurabh Shukla as Special Secretary – Freedom Cell
 Neha Pendse as Neha Das
 Asrani as Khadi Commission Boss
 Parikshat Sahni as Principal
 Murli Sharma as Godbole
 Viju Khote as Grossary Man
 Jackie Shroff
 Ashok Banthia as Hari Das (Gour Hari Das' Father)
 Rahul Vohra as Rajiv Mitra
 Vinay Apte as MLA Walve
 Siddharth Jadhav
 Neena Kulkarni as Ms. Apte
 Bharat Dabholkar as Commando 1
 Upendra Limaye as Jail Chief
 Surendra Rajan as Gandhiji
 Sandeep Kulkarni as Home Minister
 Suhas Palshikar as 1st Gandhiwadi
 Kishore Pradhan as Retired Postman
 Ganesh Yadav
 Achint Kaur
 Ananth Narayan Mahadevan
 Deepak Satsule as Alok
 Vidya Malvade as Tanvi
 Chhaya Kadam as Khadi Commission
 Khushboo as Rajiv's feminist-wife
 Satish Pulekar
 Pradeep Haldankar
 Gary Richardson as British Teacher
 Sunil Shende
 Jay Palkar as train passenger

Soundtrack

References

External links 
 

2015 films
2010s Hindi-language films
Indian biographical films
Indian political films
Films directed by Anant Mahadevan
2010s biographical films
Films scored by L. Subramaniam
2010s political films
Indian films based on actual events
Hindi-language films based on actual events
Political films based on actual events
Films set in Odisha
Films shot in Odisha